Maabaidhoo (Dhivehi: މާބައިދޫ) is one of the inhabited islands of Laamu Atoll, Medhu-dekunu Province.

It has its own dialect of Dhivehi which is considerably different from northern and mid-Maldivian speech. Kadhdhoo Airport is situated on a nearby island. Maabaidhoo also has one of the 4 mangroves in Maldives.

Geography

Demography

References

Islands of the Maldives